The kaba gaida ('large gaida') or rodopska gaida (Rhodope gaida), the bagpipe of the central Rhodope mountains, is a distinctive symbol of Bulgarian folk music. It is made from wood, horn, animal skin and cotton. It is similar to the gaida, but lower pitched and usually with a larger bag. The chanter has a specific curve at the end and has a hexagonal section. The shape of the channel inside the chanter is reverse cone. The most common drone tone on a kaba gaida is E.

The song "Izlel e Delio Haidutin", played on the kaba gaida and included on the Voyager Golden Record, was among the sounds selected to portray the diversity of human culture.

The Guinness World Record for largest bagpipe ensemble is held by the kaba gaida and 333 participants.

The gaida is played on weddings, celebrations and events. As people on the Balkans say: "A wedding without a bagpipe is like a funeral." Interest in the kaba gaida has been increasing and it is found on the ethno jazz scene.

See also
Music of Bulgaria

References

Bulgarian Kaba Gaida in E played by Corydale
Kaba Gaida online training, workshops and music around the globe
Kaba gaida
Bulgarian dance music
New Folk: The phenomenon of chalga in modern Bulgarian folk

Bagpipes
Bulgarian musical instruments